Robert Bruce of Kennet, Lord Kennet FRSE (24 December 1718 – 8 April 1785) was a Scottish advocate, legal scholar and judge.

Life

Bruce was born at Kennet House in Clackmannanshire on 24 December 1718, the son of Mary Balfour, daughter of Robert Balfour, 4th Lord Burleigh and Alexander Bruce of Kennet (died 1747).

He was admitted to the Faculty of Advocates in January 1743. He served as Professor of Law of Nature and Nations at the University of Edinburgh (1758–64) and was appointed Sheriff-Depute of Stirling & Clackmannan in 1760. He was elected a Senator of the College of Justice, as Lord Kennet, in 1764 and Lord of Justiciary in 1769.

In 1783 he was a founder member of the Royal Society of Edinburgh. His Edinburgh address at this time was at George Square.

He died at Kennet House on 8 April 1785.

Family

He married Helen Abercromby in 1745.

Bruce was the uncle of James Abercromby, 1st Baron Dunfermline. His brothers-in-law included James Stuart-Mackenzie (1719–1800), Alexander Abercromby, Lord Abercromby (1745–1795), James Edmonstone (d.1793).

Notes

1718 births
1785 deaths
18th-century Scottish judges
People from Clackmannanshire
Academics of the University of Edinburgh
Founder Fellows of the Royal Society of Edinburgh
Members of the Faculty of Advocates
Kennet